Sanae (written: 早苗 or 沙苗) is a feminine Japanese given name. Notable people with the name include:

, Japanese enka singer, actress and radio presenter
, Japanese voice actress
, Japanese mixed martial artist
, Japanese voice actress
, Japanese politician
, Japanese actress
, Japanese actress
, Japanese voice actress
, Japanese former football player
, Japanese basketball player
, Japanese actress

Fictional characters
, a character from Touhou Project
, a character from Clannad
Sanae Shioda (汐田 早苗), a character from Battle Royale II: Requiem

References

See also
 SANAE, the South African National Antarctic Expedition

Japanese feminine given names